In digital logic applications, bit-serial architectures send data one bit at a time, along a single wire, in contrast to bit-parallel word architectures, in which data values are sent all bits or a word at once along a group of wires.  

All digital computers built before 1951, and most of the early massive parallel processing machines used a bit-serial architecture—they were serial computers.

Bit-serial architectures were developed for digital signal processing in the 1960s through 1980s, including efficient structures for bit-serial multiplication and accumulation.

Often, N serial processors will take less FPGA area and have a higher total performance than a single N-bit parallel processor.

See also
 1-bit computing
 Bit banging
 Bit slicing
 Serial computer
 BKM algorithm
 CORDIC

References

External links
  Application of FPGA technology to accelerate the finite-difference time-domain (FDTD) method
  BIT-Serial FIR filters with CSD Coefficients for FPGAs

Data transmission